FBD 2023 was an inter-county Gaelic football competition in the province of Connacht, the successor to the FBD Insurance League. All five Connacht county teams participate. All games took place at the University of Galway Connacht GAA Airdome under the air-supported dome for the second year in a row.  were the winners, for the first time since 2012.

Competition format
The competition is a straight knockout. Drawn games go to extra-time and possible penalty shoot-out.

Results

References

FBD
FBD Insurance League